To Catch a Predator is an American reality television series in the television news magazine program Dateline NBC featuring confrontations with host Chris Hansen, partly filmed with a hidden camera, of adult men arriving at a sting house to have sex with a minor and typically being arrested as a result. The minors are adults impersonating underage persons (generally ages 13–15) in online chats.

The series premiered in November 2004. It followed twelve undercover sting operations as they were conducted across the United States with the watchdog group Perverted-Justice. Following the third investigation, law enforcement and other officials became involved, leading to the arrests of most individuals caught. The series was criticized for its sordid tone, and the ethical and legal concerns raised over the nature of the sting operations it depicted, in particular potential violations of entrapment laws.

The show was cancelled in 2008, following the suicide of Rockwall County, Texas, assistant district attorney Louis Conradt, as police attempted to serve him with a search warrant after he had been caught talking to and exchanging pictures with a Perverted-Justice volunteer posing as a 13-year-old boy. Conradt fatally shot himself as police and an NBC camera crew entered his home, an act that was captured by the filming crew. His estate sued Dateline for US$105 million, then settled out of court. Hansen stated that the show ended because it had simply run its course, though he later ran a Kickstarter campaign to relaunch the series, and he searched for new broadcast venues for it. In 2016, Hansen vs. Predator became a recurring segment on Crime Watch Daily, a syndicated television news magazine hosted by Hansen.

Reruns of the Dateline segments are occasionally broadcast on MSNBC. NBC affiliates WTMJ in Milwaukee, KSHB in Kansas City, and WBRE in Wilkes-Barre have also produced local versions of To Catch a Predator. Various spin-offs have aired in the same format, including To Catch a Con Man, To Catch an ID Thief, To Catch a Car Thief, and To Catch an i-Jacker, which featured iPod thieves. To Catch a Predator is also aired on FX and Crime & Investigation in the United Kingdom, the Crime & Investigation Network in Australia, and New Zealand and Fox Crime in Portugal.

History and format
To Catch a Predator began as a series of segments the American NBC news magazine/reality show Dateline NBC, premiering under the title Dangerous Web in 2004. In its four years of production, it grew to become the most popular segment on Dateline, its cultural status underlined by satirical references in parodies and other comedies, such as The Simpsons, 30 Rock, and Conan O'Brien's opening sketch at the 58th Primetime Emmy Awards in 2006.

The show's host Chris Hansen clarified in an interview with NPR News that the subjects confronted on the show should be labelled properly as potential sexual predators and not as pedophiles. Hansen stated, "Pedophiles have a very specific definition, people who are interested in prepubescent sex."

The first two investigations did not include law enforcement officers on site, and individuals caught in the sting were allowed to leave voluntarily, though Dateline would provide all video and transcripts to law enforcement and suspects would eventually be arrested. Arrests are sometimes made in a dramatic fashion by multiple officers who, with Tasers drawn, ambush the suspect and command him to lie face-down on the ground before being handcuffed. In the Fort Myers investigation, a police officer in camouflage sometimes arrested the perpetrators as they left the sting house. Tasers are sometimes shown being used to subdue fleeing or merely unresponsive individuals.

Investigations

Bethpage, Long Island, New York 
The first installment drew 18 men over the course of two and a half days to a sting house in Bethpage, New York. One of the men arrested in the series' 2004 investigation, Ryan Hogan, was a New York City firefighter, assigned to Engine Company 237 in Brooklyn, who used a firehouse computer while on duty in order to lure a Perverted-Justice agent posing as a teenage girl to have sex with him. On June 8, 2006, Hogan pleaded guilty to putting obscene photos of himself on the Internet, as part of a plea agreement. He was sentenced to five years of probation, continued psychological treatment, and submission to random polygraph tests.

Herndon, Fairfax County, Virginia 
An hour-long special that premiered in November 2005 depicted an operation in Herndon, Virginia, in the suburbs of Washington, D.C., and saw 19 men arrive over three days. Among the men caught were a rabbi and an elementary-school teacher, both of whom lost their jobs after taping.

Mira Loma, Riverside County, California 
The third installment of the series was a two-hour special aired in February 2006. The operation was located at a house on Riverboat Drive in Riverside County, California, and was the first done in cooperation with local law enforcement officials. During this sting, 51 men were arrested over three days and charged with felonies, so many that at one point, law enforcement personnel were unable to keep up with them. One other person arrested was charged with a misdemeanor. The men arrested included a criminal investigator working for the Department of Homeland Security who was later fired and, for the first time, two men who claimed to have seen previous Dateline investigations of online perpetrators trying to have sex with minors. When confronted by Hansen, another man crafted an elaborate story claiming that he had walked and rode a bus for several hours to the sting house to leave a note inquiring about construction work. The lead detective for this investigation, Chad Bianco, was elected Sheriff of Riverside County in 2018.

Greenville, Ohio
The premise behind the fourth Dateline investigation was to see if the problem of internet predators was as big a problem in small towns as it was in big cities, so Dateline set up operations in Greenville, Ohio. In total, 18 men were arrested over a three-day period between March 24th and 26th, 2006.

Fort Myers, Florida
By June 30, 2009, all the cases stemming from investigations in Fort Myers, Florida made it through the court system. Of the 24 men captured as a result of the investigation, 20 were convicted of using the Internet to solicit a child for sex. The 20 convicted men have to register as sex offenders for the rest of their lives. Most of them were also put on sex offender probation.

Fortson, Georgia 
The sheriff's department in Harris County, Georgia had arrested 20 men over four-and-a-half days in another sting operation.

Shortly after the first half of this investigation aired, the Georgia Governor's office announced a new Child Safety Initiative which would triple the number of special agents in the Georgia Bureau of Investigation dedicated to catching Internet predators and double the number of forensic computer specialists dedicated to helping prosecute computer crimes.

Petaluma, California 
In January 2010, Lt. Matthew Stapleton of the Petaluma Police Department credited a To Catch a Predator sting operation with scaring potential predators away from Petaluma. Referring to later decoy operations by local police, Stapleton said, "As soon as they found out that we were from the Petaluma area, they completely cut off communication with us."

However, after six days of testimony, a judge threw out the case against one of the defendants and criticized the tactics used by Datelines partner, Perverted-Justice, for engaging in entrapment.

Long Beach, California 
To Catch a Predator's eighth investigation was a two-part special shot in Long Beach, California. The investigation resulted in the arrest of 38 men, one of whom had previously appeared in the Riverside County investigation.

Flagler Beach, Florida 
The tenth investigation in the series was shot in Flagler Beach, Florida. Over the course of four days, 21 men were arrested, including a police officer who brought several guns. In one of the cases, a judge ordered Chris Hansen to testify at a deposition about what he witnessed.

Bowling Green, Kentucky 
When Dateline conducted an investigation in Bowling Green, Kentucky, only seven men showed up to the decoy house, a sharp decline from previous Dateline investigations. The men arrested include a man with cerebral palsy and a man who claimed to be a detective, who was tasered due to his claim that he had brought a gun with him. The taser probes failed to stick, so police chased him into the house, where he was subdued. It was later found out that he was no longer a police officer at the time and had actually been fired. All men arrested faced five to ten years in prison if convicted.

Suicide of Bill Conradt

In November 2006, Perverted-Justice announced that another To Catch a Predator sting had been conducted with law enforcement in Murphy, Texas. There were 25 men who arrived at the location on Mandeville Drive over four days, with law enforcement investigating additional suspects. The predators included a former church music director and a former police officer in his 60s. These additional suspects, who conducted chats but did not arrive at the undercover house, included Kaufman County assistant district attorney Louis Conradt, who shot and killed himself on November 5, 2006, at his home when police attempted to serve him with a search warrant, after he had been caught talking to and exchanging pictures with a Perverted-Justice volunteer posing as a 13-year-old boy. After Conradt failed to appear at a prearranged meeting, NBC and local police tracked him to his home. He committed suicide as police and an NBC camera crew entered his home, capturing the scene when the fatal shot was fired. His estate, managed by his sister Patricia Conradt, filed suit against Dateline for US$105 million. The case was eventually settled out of court for an undisclosed sum.

Reaction
The sting prompted protests from local residents, who were opposed to law enforcement officials purposely attracting sexual predators to their neighborhood. Others countered that these predators were already in the area (or close by) and that this sting revealed them to be sex offenders. NBC broadcast this investigation on February 13 and 20, 2007. Prior to the settlement of Patricia Conradt's lawsuit against NBC Universal Inc, portions from the February 20, 2007 broadcast of To Catch a Predator were intended to be introduced in civil court.

On June 1, 2007, the Collin County district attorney's office declined to prosecute any of the 23 cases brought against those arrested on this installment of the show, citing insufficient evidence. District Attorney John Roach explained that in 16 of the cases, he had no jurisdiction because the decoys and suspects who participated in the online chats were not in that county when they did so, a point seconded by Assistant DA Doris in a 2009 Esquire article. Berry also discovered that the Murphy Police Department had done "literally no prior investigation" before making the arrests, thus making most if not all of them illegal under Texas law. Furthermore, Roach explained, the involvement of non-professionals tainted many of the cases, stating, "The fact that somebody besides police officers were involved is what makes this case bad. If professionals had been running the show, they would have done a much better job rather than being at the beck and call of outsiders. The use of a residential neighborhood for the sting was also criticized by those who lived near the house used for the operation, one of whom stated that the speeding up of cars up and down the street and the sprinting of police from hiding spots with guns drawn, which led one suspect to drop a bag of crack cocaine, endangering the neighborhood. Another neighbor commented, "They can chase predators all they want, but they shouldn't do it in a populated area with children, two blocks from an elementary school. This is a family community. It didn't look kosher at all."

On September 5, 2007, Dateline aired the results of the forensic report on Conradt's computer. According to the report, Conradt's "CDs, laptop computers and cell phone all contained pornographic material—some included child pornography." Additional reporting by Esquire in 2009 disputed this claim.

Investigation by 20/20 
On September 7, 2007, the ABC newsmagazine 20/20 aired an investigative report into the To Catch a Predator series by ABC News investigative reporter Brian Ross. The report critiqued certain aspects of the specials, and also investigated the controversy over the suicide of prosecutor Louis Conradt, Jr. In the report, two former police detectives with the Murphy, Texas Police Department, Sam Love and Walter Weiss, claimed that the decision to arrest Conradt at his home was made by Chris Hansen, a charge NBC denied. Love and Weiss claimed that the NBC News crew had every intention to confront Conradt, and the attorney for Conradt's family charged that Dateline chose to stop at nothing to get Conradt. Love and Weiss also claimed that Conradt's death was shrugged off by many in Murphy's police force, and the two of them left the department in disgust.

Neither NBC News nor Perverted-Justice cooperated with Ross's report. NBC News accused ABC News of using the 20/20 report as a hit piece on the rival newsmagazine Dateline NBC. NBC News president Steve Capus told USA Today, "I chalk this up to the usual network silly competitiveness, in a territory of a much more serious handling. The competitive wars [for ratings] right now are at a very high level...That's fueling this." The allegations were denied by Ross, who was formerly a reporter for NBC News.

Cancellation and lawsuit
The show was cancelled in 2008. In an interview with Time magazine, Hansen stated that the show had simply run its course. The original episodes of To Catch a Predator continue to air occasionally on MSNBC.

In late 2007, Conradt's sister, Patricia Conradt, subsequently sued NBC Universal, saying that the police had raided Conradt's house at the behest of NBC. In January 2008, federal judge Denny Chin dismissed most of Patricia Conradt's claims, but found that she had a reasonable chance of proving that NBC had pressed police into engaging in unreasonable and unnecessary tactics solely for entertainment value, thus creating "a substantial risk of suicide or other harm." He also found that Conradt could prove that police disregarded their duty to prevent Conradt from killing himself and that NBC's actions amounted to "conduct so outrageous and extreme that no civilized society should tolerate it". NBC and Patricia Conradt reached an undisclosed settlement that June.

Criticism 
The series was accused of making news rather than reporting news, blurring the line between being a news organization versus an agency of law enforcement. Among the more prominent critics of the series has been Brian Montopoli of the CBS News Public Eye blog and formerly of the Columbia Journalism Review. Montopoli argues that although Dateline NBC leaves legal punishment up to police and prosecutors, broadcasting the suspects on national television, in the context of exposing criminal behavior, is already a form of punishment which the media have no right to inflict. Montopoli also suggests that NBC News is more concerned about ratings than actually bringing online predators to justice:

In the United Kingdom, columnist and television critic Charlie Brooker wrote of the show, "When a TV show makes you feel sorry for potential child-rapists, you know it's doing something wrong". He also commented on the "overpowering whiff of entrapment" and the potential for viewer complicity. Brooker also mentioned the selection process for the actress as being disturbing by adding "Presumably someone at To Catch a Predator HQ sat down with a bunch of audition tapes and spooled through it, trying to find a sexy 18-year-old who could pass for 13. They'll have stared at girl after girl, umming and ahhing over their chest sizes, until they found just the right one. And like I say, she's hot. But if you fancy her, you're a paedophile."

In May 2007, Marsha Bartel, a former investigative producer for Dateline, filed a $1 million breach of contract lawsuit against NBC, stating that the network fired her the year prior, with three years left on her four-year contract, and after 21 years at the company, after she refused to work on the To Catch a Predator because of ethical concerns she had about the series. Specifically, she said that Perverted Justice failed to keep accurate, verifiable records of its online interactions with suspects, which had been cited by some of the arrested men's attorneys who argued they were victims of entrapment. NBC, however, stated that Bartel was terminated because of budget cutbacks. The lawsuit was dismissed by the New York Supreme Court in October 2007. Federal Judge John W. Darrah explained that NBC has the legal right to dismiss employees without notification. NBC reacted to the outcome by issuing a statement that read "We believed from the beginning that this case was without merit and we are pleased with the judge's decision." In September 2008, the Seventh Circuit Court of Appeals upheld the judgment on appeal.

Entrapment claims 
Entrapment is a practice where a law enforcement agent induces a person to commit a criminal offense that the person would have otherwise been unlikely or unwilling to commit. It can be used as a legal defense for actions committed by the government but does not apply to investigative actions taken by a purely private organization.

Although entrapment does not ordinarily apply to actions taken by private organizations, when Perverted-Justice works sufficiently in concert with a law enforcement agency, the involvement of the state actor may allow for an entrapment defense. Perverted-Justice takes the position that it has precautions in place to avoid entrapment issues, claiming that volunteers never initiate contact with the target or instigate lewd conversations or talks of sexual meetings. However, former Dateline anchor Stone Phillips disputes that claim, arguing that, "In many cases, the decoy is the first to bring up the subject of sex." Phillips defended the tactic as enticement as opposed to entrapment, stating that, "Once the hook is baited, the fish jump and run with it like you wouldn't believe."

After a sting operation conducted by Perverted-Justice with the Riverside County Sheriff's Department, a court rejected a defendant's entrapment defense, finding no evidence to support the claim that Perverted-Justice acted as an agent of law enforcement. The conviction was affirmed on appeal, which noted the trial court's observation that the defendant initiated the contact with a Perverted Justice agent that he had thought was a 12-year-old girl.

In 2011, a case against a man who had appeared on the show was dismissed because the trial court judge did not find proof of a specific intent to commit the crime. The judge criticized the tactics used by Perverted-Justice, which he suggested lacked credibility and constituted in entrapment.

Charges dropped 
In June 2007, Perverted-Justice was criticized following a sting operation in Collin County, Texas after charges against 23 suspected online sex predators were dropped. Collin County Assistant District Attorney Greg Davis claimed the cases were dropped after Perverted-Justice failed to provide enough usable evidence that crimes were committed within the county's jurisdiction. Perverted-Justice responded by stating that the district attorney's office was changing its explanation for dropping the charges and "could not defend the claim that the evidence was 'inadequate'".

Conflict of interest
Beginning with the fourth investigation, Dateline began paying Perverted-Justice a consultant's fee to do its regular work; the fee was reported to have been over $100,000 for that operation. Al Tompkins of the Poynter Institute for Media Studies suggested that this payment created a potential conflict of interest for Perverted-Justice, an organization run largely on the efforts of volunteers, and furthermore, that for Dateline to pay this fee would be tantamount to paying news sources, a practice widely frowned upon in the journalism industry.

The department kept itself separate from Dateline staff during the sting as well, to avoid legal hassles later on, says Burns. Officials were positioned in a location near but not inside the house where offenders arrived for meetings. Communications and video equipment permitted authorities to keep tabs on what transpired, and all chats were transmitted directly to officials as they took place. "We didn't want to blur the line of ethics between law enforcement and the media," Burns explained. "We didn't even speak to Dateline officials during the operations."

The potential for conflict of interest was one of several concerns that led to the non-prosecution of 23 cases in Collin County, Texas. District Attorney John Roach questioned circumstances of the May 2007 sting, stating: "What is exactly the deal between the City of Murphy and NBC? What is the deal between NBC and Perverted-Justice? Who's getting paid what? Who has an axe to grind?" Investigative journalist Byron Harris explained, "John Roach knew the money issue would come up in court as part of the required disclosure of benefits received by possible witnesses."

Staged versions
The series inspired a trend of YouTube prankster videos produced by individuals emulating To Catch a Predator as a form of social justice activism, without police involvement or legal qualifications. In these videos, when the sting is revealed to the would-be predator lured to the sting, unlike To Catch a Predator, the YouTubers scold the alleged perpetrator and allow them to leave. These videos were debunked as fake, and not actual stings of alleged criminals, which resulted in criticism and mockery by others in the YouTube community, and led some of the content creators behind them to quit YouTube entirely. Sarah Manavis, writing for New Statesman, criticized these videos, which garnered high viewerships and brand sponsorships, saying, "If the videos are, indeed, entirely staged, then we have a problem of YouTubers lying to their audiences whilst simultaneously self-aggrandising their own actions – painting themselves as white knights when, in reality, they’re just paying actors to make them look like heroes. But if the whole thing is in fact actually real, the YouTubers are literally letting child predators head off after almost committing a violent crime – managing to both find a child predator and equally letting them get away without any legal consequences."

Hansen vs. Predator
In April 2015, Hansen announced the start of a Kickstarter campaign to fund an online reboot of the series.

At the time of the Fairfield sting, Hansen reported that he was commencing negotiations with various potential broadcast partners in an effort to find a media platform on which to air the footage that was shot during the Fairfield operation. In mid-2016, Hansen became the host of the syndicated television news magazine Crime Watch Daily, with Hansen vs. Predator installments being broadcast as a recurring segment on that show.

Book
A spin-off book, To Catch a Predator: Protecting Your Children from Online Enemies Already in Your Home, was published in 2007.

See also 

 Anti-pedophile activism
 Ephebophilia
 Hebephilia
 Jailbait
 Online predator
 Perp walk
 Public humiliation
 Reaction formation

References

External links 

 
 
 
 

Child sexual abuse in the United States
NBC original programming
2000s American television specials
2004 American television series debuts
2004 television specials
American hidden camera television series
Works about child abuse
2007 American television series endings
Vigilantism against sex offenders